The Pereiaslav Agreement or Pereyaslav Agreement, was an official meeting that convened for a ceremonial pledge of allegiance by Cossacks to the Tsar of Russia (then Alexis, who reigned 1645–1676) in the town of Pereiaslav, in central Ukraine, in January 1654. The ceremony took place concurrently with ongoing negotiations that started on the initiative of Hetman Bohdan Khmelnytsky to address the issue of the Cossack Hetmanate with the ongoing Khmelnytsky Uprising against the Polish–Lithuanian Commonwealth and which concluded the Treaty of Pereiaslav (also known as the March Articles). The treaty itself was finalized in Moscow in April 1654 (in March according to the Julian calendar).

Khmelnytsky secured the military protection of the Tsardom of Russia in exchange for allegiance to the Tsar. An oath of allegiance to the Russian monarch from the leadership of the Cossack Hetmanate was taken, shortly thereafter followed by other officials, the clergy and the inhabitants of the Hetmanate swearing allegiance. The exact nature of the relationship stipulated by the agreement between the Hetmanate and Russia is a matter of scholarly controversy. The council of Pereiaslav was followed by an exchange of official documents: the March Articles (from the Cossack Hetmanate) and the Tsar's Declaration (from Muscovy).

The council was attended by a delegation from Moscow headed by Vasiliy Buturlin. The event was soon thereafter followed by the adoption in Moscow of the so-called March Articles that stipulated an autonomous status of the Hetmanate within the Russian state. The agreement precipitated the Russo-Polish War (1654–67). The definitive legal settlement was effected under the Eternal Peace Treaty of 1686 concluded by Russia and Poland that re-affirmed Russia's sovereignty over the lands of Zaporozhian Sich and left-bank Ukraine, as well as the city of Kiev.

Background of negotiations
In January 1648, a major anti-Polish uprising led by Bohdan Khmelnytsky began in the Zaporizhia lands. Supported by popular masses and by Crimean Khanate the rebels won a number of victories over the government forces of the Polish–Lithuanian Commonwealth seeking the increase of Cossack registry (kept at the expense of the state treasury), weakening of the Polish aristocratic oppression, oppression by the Jews who governed estates as well as recovery of positions of the Orthodox Church in own lands. However, the autonomy obtained by Khmelnytsky found itself squeezed between three Great powers: the Polish–Lithuanian Commonwealth, the Tsardom of Russia and the Ottoman Empire.

Being the main leader of the uprising, Bohdan Khmelnytskyi was not able to declare independence because he was not a legitimate monarch, and there was not such a candidate among other leaders of the uprising. Considering the economic and human resources, the rebellion was taking place in regions of the Polish Crown, Kijów (Kyiv), Czernihow (Chernihiv) and Bracław (Bratslav) voivodeships. The Crimean Khan, the only ally, was not interested in a decisive victory of Cossacks.

Cossack — Moscow negotiations timeline
It is believed that negotiations to unite the Zaporizhia land with Russia started as early as in 1648. Such idea is common among Soviet historians of Ukraine and Russia such as Mykola Petrovsky. Many other Ukrainian historians among which are Ivan Krypiakevych, Dmitriy Ilovaisky, Myron Korduba, Valeriy Smoliy and others interpret negotiations as an attempt to attract the Tsar to military support of Cossacks and motivate him to struggle for the Polish Crown which became available after the death of Władysław IV Vasa.

 June 18, 1648 – the first known official letter of Bohdan Khmelnytskyi to the Tsar Alexis I; it was finished: "So let the God fulfill the prophecy, which was celebrated from ancient times, to which we gave ourselves, and to the merciful feet of your royal majesty, like the lower ones, submit obediently."
 June 18, 1648 – letter of Khmelnytskyi to the Muscovite voivode of Siveria, Leontiev. Mention of favorable attitude of the Cossacks to the Tsar. The issue of allegiance to the Tsar is not raised.
 July 21, 1648 – letter of Khmelnytskyi to the Muscovite voivode of Putivl, Pleshcheyev. Mention of motivation of the Tsar of Muscovy to the struggle for the Polish Crown. The issue of allegiance to the Tsar is not raised.
 end of December 1648 – departing of Khmelnytskyi delegation to Moscow. The delegation included the chief envoy Syluyan Muzhylovsky and Patriarch Paisius I of Jerusalem.
 January 1649 – in Moscow Patriarch Paisius convinced the Tsar of Khmelnytskyi's intentions "...striking with forehead to your Imperial Majesty, so the emperor ordered to grant him, Khmelnytskyi and all the Zaporizhian Host adoption under His high imperial hand...", but in the Muzhylovsky's notes is mentioned only request for military assistance, while the issue of allegiance to the Tsar was not raised.
 April 1649 – meeting of Khmelnytskyi with the Tsar's envoy Grigoriy Unkovsky in Chyhyryn. Hetman emphasized on the kinship of Ukraine with Moscow: "...from the baptizing by St.Vladimir we had with Moscow our one pious Christian faith and one power..." and asked for military assistance.
 May 1649 – deportation of Khmelnytskyi's envoys to Moscow headed by Chyhyryn Colonel Fedir Veshnyak. In accreditation letter it was expressed petition for protectorate of the Muscovite Tsar. "...take under own mercy and defense... whole Ruthenia" At the same time, similar delegation was sent to the Prince of Transylvania George II Rákóczi to encourage him to fight for the Polish Crown.
 August 16, 1649 – hollow victory at the Battle of Zboriv. Betrayed by Crimean Tatars, Bohdan Khmelnytskyi blamed Moscow for not sending help. Cossack-Moscow relations worsened. Hetman and his associates resorted to diplomatic pressure on Moscow: openly expressed about the need for campaign onto Muscovites and refused to give impostor Timofey Akudinov who claimed to be the son of Moscow Tsar Vasili IV of Russia.
 March 1650 – Khmelnytskyi ignored orders of the King of Poland on preparations to a shared Polish-Crimean campaign against Moscow.
 Summer-fall of 1650 – revival of the Turkish-Ukrainian dialogue to transfer under the Ottoman protectorate: "... Ukraine, White Ruthenia, Volhynia, Podolie with whole Ruthenia all the way to Wisla..."
 March 1, 1651 – Zemsky Sobor in Moscow. Moscow clergy found it possible in case of not following by the Polish side conditions of the Eternal Peace permit Alexis Mikhailovich to adopt the Zaporizhian Host as one of his subjects.
 September 1651 – to Chyhyryn arrived envoy Osman-aga and informed about readiness of the High Porte to take under its protection Ukraine. Khmelnytskyi did not rush anticipating the Moscow's answer.
 March 1652 – Khmelnytskyi's envoys in Moscow. Envoy Ivan Iskra proposed immediately to take the Zaporizhian Host under the Tsar's custody. The Tsar's government agreed to take only the army without the territory anticipating in the future give it lands in the interfluve of Don and Medveditsa.

Preparations for official meeting
The 1653 Zemsky Sobor that took place in Moscow in the fall adopted decision on including Ukraine to Muscovy and on November 2, 1653 the Moscow's government declared war onto the Polish–Lithuanian Commonwealth. To conduct negotiations between two states to Ukraine from Moscow departed a big delegation headed by boyar Vasili Buturlin. In its composition were also okolnichiy I.Olferiev, dyak L.Lopukhin and representatives of clergy.

The travel took almost three months. Besides bad roads and disorder, a new royal standard had to be made, the Buturlin's speech text, and the mace (bulawa) designated to Hetman disappeared several precious stones that had to be recovered. Also, the delegation had to wait almost a week for arrival of Bohdan Khmelnytskyi, who was delayed in Chyhyryn at the burial of his older son Tymofiy Khmelnytsky and later was not able to cross the Dnieper since the ice on the river was not strong enough.

Pereiaslav meeting and the autonomous Cossack state 

At a meeting between the council of Zaporozhian Cossacks and Vasiliy Buturlin, representative of Tsar Alexey I of the Tsardom of Russia, during the Khmelnytsky Uprising. The Pereiaslav Council of Ukrainians took place on January 18; it was meant to act as the supreme Cossack council and demonstrate the unity and determination of the "Rus' nation". Military leaders and representatives of regiments, nobles and townspeople listened to the speech by the Cossack hetman Bohdan Khmelnytsky, who expounded the necessity of seeking the Russian protection. The audience responded with applause and consent. The treaty, initiated with Buturlin later on the same day, invoked only protection of the Cossack state by the Tsar and was intended as an act of official separation of Ukraine from the Polish–Lithuanian Commonwealth (Ukrainian independence had been informally declared earlier in the course of the Uprising by Khmelnytsky). Participants in the preparation of the treaty at Pereiaslav included, besides Khmelnytsky, Chief Scribe Ivan Vyhovsky and numerous other Cossack elders, as well as a large visiting contingent from Russia.

The Cossack leaders tried in vain to exact from Buturlin some binding declarations; the envoy refused, claiming lack of authority and deferred resolution of specific issues to future rulings by the Tsar, which he expected to be favourable to the Cossacks. Khmelnytsky and many Ukrainians (127,000 total, including 64,000 Cossacks, according to the Russian reckoning) ended up swearing allegiance to the Tsar. In many Ukrainian towns, residents were forced to go to the central square to take the oath. Part of the Orthodox clergy took the oath only after a long resistance, and some Cossack leaders did not take the oath. The actual details of the agreement were negotiated the following March and April in Moscow by Cossack emissaries and the Tsardom. The Russians agreed to the majority of the Ukrainian demands, granting the Cossack state broad autonomy, large Cossack register and preservation of the status of the Kiev Orthodox Metropolitan, who would keep reporting to the Patriarch of Constantinople (rather than Moscow). The Cossack hetman was prohibited from conducting independent foreign policy, especially in respect to the Commonwealth and the Ottoman Empire, as the Tsardom pledged now to provide the Hetmanate's defense. The status of Ukraine, seen by the negotiators as being now in union with the Russian state (rather than Poland), was thus settled. The erroneous but stubborn policies of the Commonwealth are widely seen as the cause of the Cossacks' changed direction, which gave rise to a new and lasting configuration of power in central, eastern and southern Europe.

The seemingly generous provisions of the Pereiaslav-Moscow pact were soon undermined by practical politics, Moscow's imperial policies and Khmelnytsky's own maneuvering. Disappointed by the Truce of Vilna (1656) and other Russian moves, he attempted to extricate the Hetmanate from the dependency. The Pereyaslav treaty led to the outbreak of the Russo-Polish War (1654-1667) and in 1667 to the Truce of Andrusovo, in which eastern Ukraine was ceded by Poland to Russia (in practice it meant a limited recovery of western Ukraine by the Commonwealth). The Cossack Hetmanate, the autonomous Ukrainian state established by Khmelnytsky, was later restricted to left-bank Ukraine and existed under the Russian Empire until it was destroyed by Russia in 1764-1775.

The contemporary written records of the Pereiaslav-Moscow transactions do exist and are kept in the Russian State Archive of Ancient Acts in Moscow.

Historical consequences

 
The eventual consequence for the Hetmanate was the dissolution of the Zaporizhian Host in 1775 and the imposition of serfdom in the region.

For Russia, the deal eventually led to the full incorporation of the Hetmanate into the Russian state, providing a justification for the title of Russian tsars and emperors, the Autocrat of all the Russias. Russia, being at that time the only part of former Kievan Rus' which was not dominated by a foreign power, considered itself the successor of Kievan Rus' and the re-unifier of all Rus' lands. Subsequently, in the 20th century, in Soviet history and epistemology, the Council of Pereiaslav was viewed and referred to as an act of "re-unification of Ukraine with Russia".

The treaty was a political plan to save Ukraine from Polish domination. For the Polish–Lithuanian Commonwealth, the deal provided one of the early signs of its gradual decline and eventual demise by the end of the 18th century. 

In 1954, anniversary celebrations of "Ukraine's re-unification with Russia" were widespread in the Soviet Union and included the transfer of Crimea from the Russian Federation to the Ukraine. 

In 2004, after the celebration of the 350th anniversary of the event, the administration of President Leonid Kuchma of Ukraine established January 18 as the official date to commemorate the event. 

The decision adopted in Pereiaslav is viewed by Ukrainian nationalists negatively as a failed opportunity for Ukrainian independence. Since then, Ukrainian independence during the Russian Civil War was short-lived as a result of the Ukrainian–Soviet War, with the country achieving independence during the dissolution of the USSR. Pro-Russian Ukrainian parties celebrate the date of this event and renew calls for re-unification of the three East Slavic nations: Russia, Ukraine and Belarus.

In 2023, President of Poland Andrzej Duda suggested President of Ukraine Volodymyr Zelenskyy the idea of bringing the Russians to Pereiaslav following a hypothetical Russian defeat during the Russian invasion of Ukraine for the signal of a peace treaty.

See also
Cossack Hetmanate
History of the Polish–Lithuanian Commonwealth (1648–1764)
Khmelnytsky Uprising
Pereiaslav Articles
Union of Russia and Ukraine Tercentenary

References

Literature

Printed
Basarab, J. Pereiaslav 1654: A Historiographical Study (Edmonton 1982)  
Braichevsky, M. Annexation or Unification?: Critical Notes on One Conception, ed and trans G. Kulchycky (Munich 1974)
Hrushevs’kyi, M. Istoriia Ukraïny-Rusy, vol 9, bk 1 (Kiev 1928; New York 1957)
Iakovliv, A. Ukraïns’ko-moskovs’ki dohovory v XVII–XVIII vikakh (Warsaw 1934)
Dohovir het’mana Bohdana Khmel’nyts’koho z moskovs’kym tsarem Oleksiiem Mykhailovychem (New York 1954)
Ohloblyn, A. Treaty of Pereyaslav 1654 (Toronto and New York 1954)
Prokopovych, V. ‘The Problem of the Juridical Nature of the Ukraine's Union with Muscovy,’ AUA, 4 (Winter–Spring 1955)
O'Brien, C.B. Muscovy and the Ukraine: From the Pereiaslavl Agreement to the Truce of Andrusovo, 1654–1667 (Berkeley and Los Angeles 1963)
Pereiaslavs'ka rada 1654 roku. Istoriohrafiia ta doslidzhennia (Kiev 2003)  
Velychenko, S., THE INFLUENCE OF HISTORICAL, POLITICAL, AND SOCIAL IDEAS,
ON THE POLITICS OF BOHDAN KHMELNYTSKY AND THE COSSACK OFFICERS BETWEEN 1648 AND 1657 PhD Dissertation (University of London, 1981) <>

Online
To the History of the Treaty of Pereyaslav, Zerkalo Nedeli (the Mirror Weekly), October 4–10, 2003, available online in Russian and in Ukrainian.
Encyclopedia of Ukraine entry on the subject
Ukrainian World Congress' Statement Press Release - On Observance of the Pereyaslav Treaty
The Treaty of Pereyaslav

1654 in Russia
Cossack Rada
1654 treaties
Pereyaslav
Military alliances involving Russia
Russia–Ukraine relations
Treaties of the Cossack Hetmanate
Cossack uprisings
17th century in the Zaporozhian Host
Bilateral treaties of Russia
Alexis of Russia